"Evilmainya" is a song by Grace Jones, released as a single in 1993.

Background
The song was written by Jon Acevski, David Ashton, David Dundas and Rick Wentworth. It was used in the soundtrack of the 1992 animated film Freddie as F.R.O.7, written and directed by Acevski. The single was not a success and did not chart.

Tracklisting

Maxi-single and digital editions:
Black Machine Remix Club Mix (4:25)
Black Machine Remix Album Edit (3:41)
Black Machine Version Remix by NN (5:51)
Black Machine Remix Extended Mix (4:09)

References

1993 singles
Grace Jones songs
1993 songs